Ron Ehrenreich (born 1950) is an American credit union officer and teacher. He was the Vice-Presidential candidate for the Socialist Party USA in the 1988 United States presidential election, as the running mate of Willa Kenoyer. The ticket received 3,882 votes, 2,587 of the votes came from New Jersey. He has been the treasurer of the Syracuse Cooperative Federal Credit Union since its opening in 1982.  He later ran as a Green Party candidate for Onondaga County, New York Comptroller in 1999. Ron is married to Sondra Roth, and has two children.

References

External links
 "Writer and Teacher to Head Socialist's Ticket for 1988"  N.Y. Times June 9, 1987
 Tori Woods, "My 6... Ways to protect your identity" The Post-Standard January 25, 2006
 Ed Griffin-Nolan "Extra Credit" Syracuse New Times June 20, 2007

American socialists
New York (state) Greens
New York (state) socialists
Politicians from Syracuse, New York
Socialist Party USA vice presidential nominees
1988 United States vice-presidential candidates
20th-century American politicians
1950 births
Living people
Socialist Party USA politicians from New York (state)
Activists from Syracuse, New York